LÉ Niamh (P52) is a  in the Irish Naval Service. The ship is named after Niamh, queen of Tír na nÓg, from Irish mythology. Commissioned in 2001,  the ship was in active service.

Design
The ship was designed by STX Canada Marine (formerly Kvaerner Masa Marine) and has an all-steel hull based on the Mauritian patrol vessel  launched in 1995, but without the helicopter deck and hangar facilities. The level of automation incorporated into the ship's systems allows the ship to be operated with just 44 crew including six officers. The vessel is designed for winter North Atlantic operations.

Weapons systems
The ship is armed with an OTO Melara 76 mm dual purpose gun installed on the bow gun deck. It also has two 12.7 mm (.50 inch) machine guns and two 20 mm Rheinmetall Rh202 Canon for anti-aircraft defence.

The main gun is controlled by an Ultra Electronics Command and Control Systems, Radamec 1500 optronic director with a daylight TV camera, thermal imaging camera and eyesafe laser rangefinder. System 1500 functions in automatic or manual mode. The system provides fire control for surface engagement with spotting corrections in both line and range and has an effective secondary self-defence anti-air capability. The ship's Kelvin Hughes surface search radar, operating at E, F and I bands, is installed high on the main mast over the bridge. The Kelvin Hughes navigation radar operates at I-band.

Command and control
The communications package includes VHF, HF, Inmarsat Global Maritime Distress Safety System (GMDSS) and Differential Global Positioning System (DFPS) and secure communications. Three inflatable boats are deployed from each ship; two  Delta rigid inflatable boats (RIB) launched with Caley davits, and a single Avon  RIB.

Propulsion
The ship is powered by two Wärtsilä 16V26 diesel engines each developing  continuous power. The engines drive two shafts with Lips inboard turning controllable pitch propellers via single reduction gearboxes. Each propeller is 2,500 mm in diameter and functions at 300 rpm.

A Brunvoll FU45 CPP bow thruster, rated at 340 kW with 5.6 t (55 kN) thrust, is fitted for precision manoeuvring and station keeping. The vessel is also equipped with a pair of non-retractable anti-roll fin stabilisers.

Three Caterpillar 3412D1-T generators each deliver 405 kWe at 1,500 rpm. One Caterpillar 3406D1-T emergency generator delivers 205 kWe at 1,500 rpm.

Construction and career
The second of the Róisín or P50 class of offshore patrol boats, Niamh was built by Appledore Shipbuilders in Devon, entered service with the Irish Naval Service in July 2001, and is based at the Haulbowline Island, Cork Harbour Headquarters and Dockyard.
Niamh's adopted home port is Limerick City.

In February 2002, 5 months after she was commissioned, Niamh departed from Haulbowline on the most ambitious deployment ever undertaken by an Irish Naval Service vessel; initially tasked with resupplying Irish Army troops deployed as part of the United Nations Mission in Ethiopia and Eritrea, she subsequently undertook a cruise to a number of nations in Asia as part of the Irish government's overseas trade promotion strategy  visiting Hong Kong, Incheon, Shanghai, Tokyo and Penang over a four-month period. During the cruise, Niamh became the first Irish warship to both transit the Suez Canal and cross the Equator.

In November 2008 Niamh played an important role in the seizure of €750 million of cocaine off the Irish coast as part of Operation Seabight. The ship was used by authorities to approach and board the yacht Dances with Waves, which contained 75 bales of the controlled substance.

From July–September 2015, Niamh took part in a humanitarian operation in the Mediterranean: rescuing migrants from unseaworthy vessels. This included a significant incident when Niamh was first to respond to the capsizing of a boat carrying hundreds of migrants off the coast of Libya. 367 migrants were rescued by the crew of Niamh and brought to Palermo — though several hundred were feared drowned. Niamh returned to Ireland in October 2015, before undertaking additional missions under Operation Sophia in subsequent years.

As of mid-2021, the vessel had reportedly commenced a midlife refit, which was projected to take between 12 and 18 months. In January 2023, LÉ Niamh and LÉ Róisin had reportedly been tied-up at Haulbowline and would not be "[sent] on patrol due to the crippling staffing retention and recruitment crisis in the Defence Forces".

See also
 RNZN

References

External links
 Defence Forces Ireland LÉ Niamh webpage
 Web page from the naval architecture firm that designed IDF LÉ Niamh.
 Appledore's page on Niamh

2001 ships
Ships built in Devon
Róisín-class offshore patrol vessels